Bolbec is a commune in the Seine-Maritime department in the Normandy region in northern France. Its inhabitants are called Bolbécais or Bolbécaises.

Geography
It is the source of the river Commerce, though here it is known as the river Bolbec. The town has many small lanes (ruelles) with some pretty houses.

History
The first written record of the town dates from the end of the 11th century, as Bolebec. Archeological discoveries indicate that the site has been inhabited since ancient times. The first lord of Bolbec was Osbern de Bolbec (around 992) and the last was the Duc de Charost who was executed during the French revolution. Through the Norman family of de Bolbec, the town gives its name to the village of Swaffham Bulbeck in Cambridgeshire, England.

Bolbec developed thanks to the numerous mills which lined the river banks through the town. These mills, numbering 14 in the middle of the 19th century, allowed the development of a textile industry based on water power, and later steam, to power the machinery.

Today, only three mills remain: one at the source of the river in the grounds of the Oril factory; one at Vallot; and one in the Ruelle Papavoine.

At the end of the 18th century, a number of manufacturers installed themselves in Bolbec to produce "Indiennes" (printed textiles). On the eve of the Revolution, Bolbec had 18 factories. In 1806, there were 27 producing Indiennes employing nearly 800 workers.

The importance of textiles in the Bolbec Valley was recognised by the state with the creation of the Chambre des Arts et Manufactures in 1806 (which became the Chamber of Commerce and Industry) and further, with the creation of a Conseil des Prud'hommes in 1813. However, over the years the textile industry suffered economic crises and by the end of the 19th century there was just one indiennerie remaining.

Bolbec is the last French town in which Thomas Jefferson, his family, and Sally and James Hemings stayed in 1789 prior to their arrival in Le Havre to return to America after their time in Paris.

Bolbec today
Little remains of the textile history of the town. A single former factory remains, that of the Desgenétais works, closed in 1986. In effect, this site is the last witness of the impact of the textile factories on Bolbec town planning: school, creche, chapel, workers' and foremen's houses… The site provides an exceptional insight into the epoch.

Heraldry

Population

Economy
Bolbec is the seat of the Chamber of Commerce and Industry of Bolbec - Lillebonne.

Industry
The principal employers in Bolbec are Oril Industrie, part of the Servier Pharmaceutical group, and Cooper Standard Automotive, automobile equipment manufacturers specialising in waterproofing

Sights
 Saint-Michel Church
 Manoir de Cailletot
 Mills: Moulins Seminel et du Vallot
 Château du Val au Grès

Notable people
 François Amable Ruffin, (1771–1811), general
 Richard Charles Blondel, (born 1827), general
 Marion Gilbert, (1876–1951), writer
 Jacques Prevel, (1915–1951), poet
 Dominique Noguez, born 1942, writer
 Jacques Caudebec, (1664–1766), Huguenot Settler in America

Twin towns
  Ostercappeln
  Bad Essen
  Bohmte

See also
Communes of the Seine-Maritime department

References

Bibliography
 Edouard-Ferdinand Collen-Castaigne, Essai historique et statistique sur la ville de Bolbec, Rouen, 1839
 Gustave F Mauconduit, Histoire des rues de Bolbec, Rouen, 1887
 Pierre Dardel, Les Manufactures de toiles peintes et de serges imprimées à Rouen et à Bolbec aux XVIIe et XVIIIe siècles, Rouen, 1940
 Jacques Vauquelin, La libération de Bolbec (Aout-Septembre 1954), Bolbec, 1969
 Jacques Vauquelin, Bolbec, ses rues… ses places…, Bolbec, 1970
 Jacques Vauquelin, Bolbec et son histoire…, Bolbec, 1974
 Jacques Vauquelin, Chateaux - Manoirs - Monuments et Sites de la région Bolbécaise, Bolbec, 1977
 Bolbec. Les hôtels de ville, les statues du jardin public, 1982
 Collège Roncherolles / L.E.P. Pierre de Coubertin, Bolbec et son canton <<Boulbai et son canton>>, Bolbec, 1982
 Alain Avenel et Raymond Bernard, Splendeur des indiennes bolbécaises, Bolbec, 1996
 Raymond Bernard, Bolbec. Ses rues d'hier à aujourd'hui, 2003
 Alain Gilles / Jean-Marc Derrien, Bolbec dans les années 1900 - 1 - Monuments, lieux publics, gare, rues..., 2004
 Alain Gilles / Jean-Marc Derrien, Bolbec de 1900 à 2000 - 3 - Travail et distractions des Bolbécais(es), biographie de Léon Desgenétais, sports, divers..., 2006
 Raymond Bernard, Bolbec. Ses écoles d'hier à aujourd'hui, 2006
 Philippe Delacroix, C.C.P.W.E n° 23. Le camp de prisonniers de guerre allemands de Bolbec (février 1945 - Août 1946)

Communes of Seine-Maritime